Ilkka Auer (16 March 1930 – 16 August 2013) was a Finnish middle-distance runner. He competed in the men's 3000 metres steeplechase at the 1956 Summer Olympics.

References

1930 births
2013 deaths
Athletes (track and field) at the 1956 Summer Olympics
Finnish male middle-distance runners
Finnish male steeplechase runners
Olympic athletes of Finland
Place of birth missing